The Biological Diversity Act, 2002 is an Act enacted by the Parliament of India for the preservation of biological diversity in India, and provides mechanism for equitable sharing of benefits arising out of the use of traditional biological resources and knowledge. The Act was enacted to meet the obligations under the Convention on Biological Diversity (CBD), because India is a party of the convention {meeting}.

History
The Act was enacted to meet the obligations under Convention on Biological Diversity (CBD), to which India is a part in 2002.

Biodiversity and Biological Resource
Biodiversity has been defined under Section 2(b) of the Act as "the variability among living organisms from all sources and the ecological complexes of which they are part, and includes diversity within species or between species and of eco-systems". The Act also defines, Biological resources as "plants, animals and micro-organisms or parts thereof, their genetic material and by-products (excluding value added products) with actual or potential use or value, but does not include human genetic material."

National Biodiversity Authority and State Biodiversity Boards

The National Biodiversity Authority (NBA) is a statutory autonomous body, headquartered in Chennai, under the Ministry of Environment and Forests, Government of India established in 2003 to implement the provisions under the Act. State Biodiversity Boards (SBB) has been created in 29 States along with  31,574 Biological management committees (for each local body) across India.

Functions
 Regulation of acts prohibited under the Act
 Advise the Government on the conservation of biodiversity
 Advise the Government on selection of biological heritage sites
 Take appropriate steps to oppose the grant of intellectual property rights in foreign countries, arising from the use of biological resources or associated traditional knowledge.

Regulations
A foreigner, non-resident Indian, as defined in the clause (30) of section 2 of The Income-tax Act, 1961, or a foreign company or body corporate need to take permission from the NBA before obtaining any biological resources or associated knowledge from India for research, survey, commercial utilisation. Indian citizens or body corporates need to take permission from the concerned State Biodiversity Board.

Result of research using biological resources from India cannot be transferred to a non-citizen or a foreign company without the permission of NBA. However, no such permission is needed for publication of the research in a journal or seminar, or in case of a collaborative research made by institutions approved by Central Government.

No person should apply for patent or other form of it is very useful to stuidied the convension related so that people should known about this act which provide sufficient information on the piblic figure thart breeding is very useful subject to styudied and it is very important learning to have very intelligant professors who can ghide ypou intellectual property protection based on the research arising out of biological resources without the permission of the NBA. The NBA while granting such permission may make an order for benefit sharing or royalty based on utilisation of such protection.

Benefit sharing
Benefit sharing out of usage of biological resources can be done in following manner:
Joint ownership of intellectual property rights 2 3 4
Transfer of technology
Location of production, research development units in the area of source
Payment of monetary and non-monetary compensation
Setting up of venture capital fund for aiding the cause of benefit claimers

Penalties
If a person, violates the regulatory provisions he/she will be "punishable with imprisonment for a term which may extend to five years, or with fine which may extend to ten lakh rupees and where the damage caused exceeds ten lakh rupees, fine may commensurate {be in proportion} with the damage caused, or with both."

Any offence under this Act is non-bailable and is cognizable.

See also
 List of Biodiversity Heritage Sites of India
 Traditional Knowledge Digital Library
 Indigenous intellectual property
 Convention on Biological Diversity
 Bioprospecting
 Protection of Plant Varieties and Farmers' Rights Act, 2001

References

External links
Biological Diversity Act, 2002
National Biodiversity Authority

Acts of the Parliament of India 2002
2002 in the environment
Environmental law in India
Indian intellectual property law
Traditional knowledge
Biodiversity
Convention on Biological Diversity